Smørstabbtindene is a mountain group in Lom Municipality in Innlandet county, Norway. The group of mountains is located in the larger Jotunheimen mountain range and inside Jotunheimen National Park. The Smørstabbtindene mountains are traditionally thought of as the dividing line between the Sognefjellet and Jotunheimen mountains.

The main peaks on the Smørstabbtindene range include:
Storebjørn ("Big Bear"), 
Store Smørstabbtinden, 
Sokse, 
Veslebjørn ("Little Bear"), 
Kniven,  
Skeie, 
Kalven ("The Calf"), 
Søre Smørstabbtinden, 
Geite ("Goat"),

See also
List of mountains of Norway by height

References

Jotunheimen
Lom, Norway
Mountains of Innlandet